Cervical vein may refer to:

 Deep cervical vein
 Transverse cervical veins